Yuri Nikolayevich Shishkin (born 9 January 1963) is a Russian professional football coach and a former player. He is the goalkeepers' coach with FC Kuban Krasnodar.

Club career
He made his professional debut in the Soviet Top League in 1982 for PFC CSKA Moscow. After that, he signed for Rio Branco.

Honours
 Soviet Top League runner-up: 1990.
 Latvian Higher League runner-up: 2002.

References

External links

1963 births
Footballers from Voronezh
Living people
Soviet footballers
Russian footballers
Russian expatriate footballers
Expatriate footballers in Brazil
Expatriate footballers in South Korea
Expatriate footballers in Latvia
Soviet Top League players
Russian Premier League players
PFC CSKA Moscow players
Rio Branco Esporte Clube players
FC Okean Nakhodka players
Jeonnam Dragons players
FC KAMAZ Naberezhnye Chelny players
PFC Krylia Sovetov Samara players
FC Fakel Voronezh players
Russian expatriate sportspeople in South Korea
FK Ventspils players
Russian expatriate sportspeople in Latvia
Association football goalkeepers